Marblehead is a coastal New England town in Essex County, Massachusetts, along the North Shore. Its population was 20,441 at the 2020 census.  The town lies on a small peninsula that extends into the northern part of Massachusetts Bay.  Attached to the town is a near island, known as Marblehead Neck, connected to the mainland by a narrow isthmus.  Marblehead Harbor, protected by shallow shoals and rocks from the open sea, lies between the mainland and the Neck.  Beside the Marblehead town center, two other villages lie within the town: the Old Town, which was the original town center, and Clifton, which lies along the border with the neighboring town of Swampscott.

A town with roots in commercial fishing and yachting, Marblehead was a major shipyard and is often referred to as the birthplace of the American Navy, a title sometimes disputed with nearby Beverly. Marblehead was once the fishing capital of Massachusetts. It is also the origin of Marine Corps Aviation. Three US Navy ships have been named USS Marblehead. A center of recreational boating, it is a popular sailing, kayaking and fishing destination. Several yacht clubs were established here in the late 19th century, which continue to be centers of sailing.

It is home to the Marblehead Light, Fort Sewall, Little Harbor, Marblehead Neck Audubon Wildlife Sanctuary, Crocker Park, and Devereux Beach. Archibald Willard's famous painting The Spirit of '76 currently resides in Abbot Hall.  Much of the Old Town is protected by the Marblehead Historic District.

Marblehead is also home of the Marblehead Men's Softball League which was established in 1939 and is the oldest and longest standing adult softball league in the world.

History

Massebequash 
Marblehead was originally called Massebequash after the river which ran between it and Salem. The land was inhabited by the Naumkeag tribe of the Pawtucket confederation under the overall sachem Nanepashemet. Epidemics in 1615–1619 and 1633, believed to be smallpox, devastated the tribe. Numerous shell mounds and burial sites have been found throughout the town's history, along with foundations of multiple villages and forts. On September 16, 1684, heirs of Nanepashemet sold their ; the deed is preserved today at Abbot Hall in the town.

European settlers and fishing 
Marblehead's first European settler was Joseph Doliber in 1629, who set up on the shore near what is now the end of Bradlee Road. Three years earlier, Isaac Allerton, a Pilgrim from the Mayflower, had arrived in the area and established a fishing village at Marblehead Little Harbor. In May 1635, the General Court of Massachusetts Bay established the town of Marblehead on land that belonged to Salem. Marblehead residents, who never saw eye-to-eye with their more devout and conservative neighbors, were delighted, but less than a year later, the lawmakers reversed themselves. Marblehead finally became independent of Salem in 1649.At times called "Marvell Head", "Marble Harbour" (by Captain John Smith) and "Foy" (by immigrants from Fowey, Cornwall), the town would be named "Marblehead" by settlers who mistook its granite ledges for marble. It began as a fishing village with narrow crooked streets, and developed inland from the harbor. The shoreline smelled of drying fish, typically cod. These were exported abroad and to Salem.

The town had one accused individual during the Salem Witch Trials, Wilmot Redd. She was found guilty of witchcraft and executed by hanging on September 22, 1692.

The town peaked economically just before the American Revolution, as locally financed privateering vessels sought bounty from large European ships. Much early architecture survives from the era, including the Jeremiah Lee Mansion.

Revolutionary War 
A large percentage of residents became involved early in the Revolutionary War, and the sailors of Marblehead are generally recognized by scholars as forerunners of the United States Navy. The first vessel commissioned for the army, Hannah, was equipped with cannons, rope, provisions (including the indigenous molasses/sea water cookie known as "Joe Frogger" ), and a crew from Marblehead. With their nautical backgrounds, soldiers from Marblehead under General John Glover were instrumental in the escape of the Continental Army after the Battle of Long Island.The Marblehead militia had become the 14th Continental Regiment of George Washington's army—and one of the few integrated regiments in the entire army. Marblehead men ferried George Washington across the Delaware River for his attack on Trenton. Many who set out for war, however, did not return, leaving the town with 459 widows and 865 orphaned children in a population of less than 5,000.

The community lost a substantial portion of its population and economy, although it was still the tenth-largest inhabited location in the United States at the first census, in 1790.

When George Washington visited the town during his presidential tour of 1789, he knew the sailors of Marblehead well; they had served him honorably in the war. He observed that the town "had the appearance of antiquity."

Fishing industry 
In the 75 years from the American Revolution to the middle of the nineteenth century, Marblehead experienced a golden age of fishing. The War of 1812 brought disruption similar to during the American Revolution, with fishing grounds being blockaded, and fisherman heading off to war, with over 500 Marbleheaders being imprisoned by the British. After the war, and later into the 19th century, wealthier citizens wanted a new bank to finance vessels, and to serve the town's fishermen and merchants. On March 17, 1831, with a capital of US$100,000, they founded the Grand Bank. The name was changed to National Grand Bank on October 3, 1864.

The town's fishermen had 98 vessels (95 of which exceeded 50 tons) putting to sea in 1837, where they often harvested fish off the Grand Banks of Newfoundland. However, a gale or hurricane in that area on September 19, 1846, sank 11 vessels and damaged others. With 65 men and boys lost in the storm, the town's fishing industry began a decline. The storm is depicted in Fireboard: The Great Gale of 1846, c. 1850 by William Thompson Bartoll. A copy of the book is held by the Peabody Essex Museum.

American Civil War 
During the American Civil War, 1,048 Marblehead men went to war, joining both the Army and Navy. One hundred ten died; 87 were wounded, many of whom died later of their injuries. During the war, Marblehead would raise almost $100,000 to supplement the war effort, an incredible effort for a town of 8,000 that relied mainly on fishing for income. Marblehead would be the first regiment in the state to answer the call for troops. A Grand Army of the Republic veterans organization was formed after the war, and established headquarters in the old town house, where it still displays artifacts from the Marblehead regiments that served.

Shoemaking, airplanes, and yachting 

During the late 19th century, Marblehead had a short-term industrial boom from shoe-making factories. At the same time, the exceptional harbor attracted yachting by wealthy boat owners, and some yacht clubs established centers there. It would become home to the Boston Yacht Club, Corinthian Yacht Club, Eastern Yacht Club, Marblehead Yacht Club, Dolphin Yacht Club, and the oldest junior yacht club in America, the Pleon Yacht Club. This also caused numerous "summer homes" of wealthy Boston residents to be built on Marblehead Neck. The building boom would cause Marblehead Light to be replaced in 1896 with a new iron structure since the light of shorter tower was becoming blocked by the large new homes.

Marblehead was also the site of the Burgess & Curtis Aircraft Factory, where it was the first licensed aircraft manufacturer in the United States. William Starling Burgess designed and flight-tested most of the aircraft that were manufactured at the two plant sites in town. On August 20, 1912, Alfred Austell Cunningham became the first Marine aviator, taking off from Marblehead Harbor in a Burgess Model H seaplane given to him by the Burgess Company. His flight was the start of United States Marine Corps Aviation.

Post-war suburban community 

After World War II, the town enjoyed a population boom, developing as a bedroom community for nearby Boston, Lynn, and Salem. This boom ended around 1970, when the town became built out. Marblehead today continues to be a sailing and small-town tourism destination in the summer months.

Town government 
The Town of Marblehead has an open town meeting, and is led by a Board of Selectmen. A board of seven selectmen first met on Friday, December 22, 1648.

Town hall 

The seat of the first town government used the existing Meeting House on what is now the site of Old Burial Hill. The meeting house served as a place for the town to meet and the main church in town; a dual use that was typical during this time period. The second meeting house was built around 1696 on Franklin Street, which would become known as the "Old Meeting House", also serving the dual use of a town meeting location and church. In 1726, it was decided by the town to construct a separate Town House, which was completed in 1727 (Old Town House). However, the Old Meeting House would continue to occasionally be used for large town meetings, before it was demolished around 1825 after the new First Congregational Church was built (Old North Church). The Town House would serve as the town hall until the construction of Abbot Hall in 1876, where the town clerk and board of selectmen still meet today.

Geography and transportation

Marblehead is situated on the North Shore of Massachusetts along Massachusetts Bay and Salem Harbor. The town consists of a rocky peninsula that extends into the bay, with an additional neck to the east connected by a long sandbar, now a causeway. This ring of land defines Marblehead's deep, sheltered harbor. Marblehead Neck is home to a bird sanctuary, as well as Castle Rock and Chandler Hovey Park at its northern tip, where Marblehead Light is located.
 
Fountain Park and Fort Sewall are located at the west edge of the mouth of Marblehead Harbor. The town land also includes several small islands in Massachusetts Bay and Dolliber Cove, the area between Peaches Point and Fort Sewall. The town is partially divided from Salem by the Forest River, and is also home to several small ponds. Keeping with the town's location, there are four beaches (one in Dolliber Cove, one in Marblehead Harbor, and two along the southern shore of town), as well as six yacht clubs, one public kayaking center and several boat ramps.

Besides Marblehead Neck, there are two other villages within town, the Old Town to the northeast and Clifton to the southwest. Given its small area, most of the residential land in town is thickly settled. It is bordered by Swampscott to the south and Salem to the northwest. (As Salem's water rights extend into Massachusetts Bay, there is no connection between Marblehead and the city of Beverly across Beverly Harbor.)

Marblehead is home to the eastern termini of Massachusetts Route 114 and Route 129, which both terminate at the intersection of Pleasant Street and Ocean Avenue. Route 114 heads west into Salem, while Route 129 heads south along Atlantic Avenue into Swampscott towards Lynn. There are no freeways within town, with the nearest access being to Massachusetts Route 128 in Peabody and Beverly.

The former Eastern Railroad began service in 1839 and had lines connecting through Swampscott and Salem was discontinued in the late 1950s. The track routes were converted to bike trails and the three train depots were torn down. The Newburyport/Rockport Line of the MBTA Commuter Rail passes through neighboring Swampscott and Salem, with service between the North Shore and Boston's North Station. The nearest air service is located at Beverly Municipal Airport, with the nearest national and international service at Boston's Logan International Airport. Seasonal ferry service to Boston can also be found in Salem.

Historic maps 

Marblehead in 1700
1781 Northshore Coastal Map
1795 Marblehead Map
1804 Marblehead Harbor Bowditch Map
1830 Marblehead Map
1850 Plan of Marblehead, Mass
1872 Marblehead Map
1881 Atlas of Marblehead published by Hopkins.
1882 Bird's Eye View of Marblehead
1885 Marblehead Map – Sanborn Fire Insurance
1890 Marblehead Map – Sanborn Fire Insurance
1896 Marblehead Map – Sanborn Fire Insurance
1897 Atlas of Marblehead
1901 Marblehead Map – Sanborn Fire Insurance
1908 Marblehead Map – Sanborn Fire Insurance
1912 Marblehead Atlas.
1915 Marblehead Map – Sanborn Fire Insurance

Climate

Demographics

As of the census of 2010, there were 19,808 people, 8,838 households, and 5,467 families residing in the town. The racial makeup of the town was 97.6% White, 0.4% Black or African American, 0.1% Native American, 1.0% Asian, >0.1% Pacific Islander, 0.2% from other races, and 0.7% from two or more races. Hispanic or Latino of any race were 0.9% of the population.

There were 8,541 households, out of which 31.2% had children under the age of 18 living with them, 56.5% were married couples living together, 8.0% had a female householder with no husband present, and 33.5% were non-families. Of all households 28.7% were made up of individuals, and 10.7% had someone living alone who was 65 years of age or older. The average household size was 2.37 and the average family size was 2.94.

In the town, the population was spread out, with 23.9% under the age of 18, 3.5% from 18 to 24, 28.0% from 25 to 44, 29.0% from 45 to 64, and 15.6% who were 65 years of age or older. The median age was 42 years. For every 100 females, there were 89.3 males. For every 100 females age 18 and over, there were 84.3 males.

According to a 2009 estimate, the median income for a household in the town was $97,441, and the median income for a family was $129,968. Males had a median income of $70,470 versus $44,988 for females. The per capita income for the town was $46,738. About 3.2% of families and 4.3% of the population were below the poverty line, including 5.7% of those under age 18 and 4.6% of those age 65 or over.

Education 
Marblehead Public Schools oversees four schools:  Brown and Glover elementary schools; the Village School (grades 4–6); Marblehead Veterans Middle School; and Marblehead High School. The town is also home to the Marblehead Community Charter Public School, the first Commonwealth charter school to open in Massachusetts.

Town song 
The Town of Marblehead has the unique distinction of having an official town anthem "Marblehead Forever". It is performed at most major town events and commemorations. It was written by the Reverend Marcia Martin Selman to the music of the hymn tune "The Lily of the Valley", from a melody by J. R. Murray, "Songs of Rejoicing", 1888.

Points of interest
 Castle Rock Park
 Crocker Park, the gift of Uriel Crocker
Crowninshield (Brown's) Island
 The Driftwood
Herreshoff Castle
 The Landing, public town dock on Front Street
Marblehead Historic District
Marblehead Light, Chandler Hovey Park
 Marblehead Neck Wildlife Sanctuary
 Pleon Yacht Club, the oldest junior yacht club in the United States
 Little Harbor Boathouse, the public kayaking outfitter on Little Harbor

Historical sites and museums

Abbot Hall (1877), containing The Spirit of '76 by Archibald MacNeal Willard, & Maritime Exhibit
Fort Sewall (1644)
Old Burial Hill (1638)
 Marblehead Museum
 Old Town House (1727)  & G.A.R. Civil War Museum
General John Glover House
General Glover Farm
Jeremiah Lee Mansion (1768)
King Hooper Mansion (1728), now home to the Marblehead Arts Association.
 Old Powder House (1755)
Ambrose Gale House (1663)
Simon Bradstreet House (1723)
St. Michael's Church (1714)
Old North Church (1824)
 William L. Hammond Park (formally recognized as the birthplace of Marine Corps Aviation, 1977)
 Gun House (1810)

Yacht clubs 

There are six active yacht clubs in town:

Notable people

Politicians and military

 Nicholas Broughton, first Captain of the American Navy
 Elbridge Gerry, fifth Vice President of the United States
 John Glover, Revolutionary War general
 John Manley, Commodore, American Navy
 David D. McKiernan, retired United States Army four-star general
 Seth Moulton, retired Marine Corps officer and a Democratic Congressman
 Samuel Sewall, Congressman, great uncle to Louisa May Alcott
 Duncan Sleigh, U.S. Marine, Navy Cross recipient 
 Joseph Story, Supreme Court justice

Athletes

 Sheldon Brown, bicycle mechanic and author of books on cycling
 Shalane Flanagan, Olympic runner, Beijing Olympics Silver medalist, 2017 New York Marathon winner
 Tyler Hamilton, cyclist
 Kayla Harrison, mixed martial artist, won the 2010 World Championships, gold medals at the 2012 and 2016 Olympics
 Ted Hood, yachtsman, America's Cup winner
 Shawn McEachern, Stanley Cup winner
 Maureen McKinnon-Tucker, Gold Medalist Sailing 2008 Summer Paralympics
 Jake Phelps, skateboarder – editor-in-chief Thrasher Magazine
 Cory Schneider, New Jersey Devils goaltender

Architects and yacht designers

 William Starling Burgess, yacht designer and aircraft manufacturer
 L. Francis Herroshoff, yacht designer

Businessmen and entrepreneurs

 Uriel Crocker, publisher, businessman
 Joseph Dixon: inventor who pioneered in the industrial use of graphite, leading to Dixon Ticonderoga pencils
 James J.H. Gregory, horticulturalist, known as the "Seed King". Also founded charitable traveling library extension service Marblehead Libraries for southern African Americans
 Peter Lynch, investor, author
 Lydia Pinkham Gove: granddaughter of entrepreneur Lydia Pinkham, built mansion Carcassonne on Marblehead Neck with commendation from President Roosevelt, she was the first woman to fly in plane across the United States
 Michael Smith, American diplomat and trade negotiator

Writers and journalists

 Ashley Bowen, first American sailor to write an autobiography
 Susan Estrich, lawyer, professor, author, political operative
 Julia Glass, novelist
 Katherine Howe, novelist
 Ada Louise Huxtable, architecture critic, lived in Marblehead seasonally for over 30 years
 Martha Hooper Blackler Kalopothakes (1830–1871), missionary, journalist, translator
 Ruth Edna Kelley, author
 Harry Kemelman, novelist
 Edward A. Lawrence, Jr. (1847-1893), Protestant pastor, author; namesake of Lawrence House (Baltimore)
 Caroline Atherton Mason, poet
 Eugene O'Neill, playwright and winner of the Nobel Prize in Literature 1936
 Rhod Sharp, news journalist, broadcaster, BBC – "Up All Night"
 Amy Siskind, activist and author
 Tasha Tudor, Caldecott honored children's author and illustrator, daughter of William Starling Burgess, great-granddaughter of Frederic Tudor

Arts and entertainment
 Amelia Peabody, sculptor, breeder and philanthropist
 Keith Ablow, former psychiatrist, writer, host and pundit
 Frank Black, musician and member of the alternative rock band Pixies
 Rob Delaney, comedian and "funniest person on Twitter"
 Loyd Grossman, UK television host
 Dave Mattacks, English-born rock and folk drummer and session musician; former member of Fairport Convention and guest percussionist for Jethro Tull
 Pete Muller, National Geographic photographer
 Estelle Parsons, actress, Academy Award winner for Actress in a Supporting Role – Bonnie and Clyde (1967)
 Rhod Sharp, BBC Radio presenter of Up All Night
 Jamie Walters, actor, musician and star of 90210

Notable visitors
===Politicians and royalty===
President George Washington: 1789, George Washington part of his ten-day presidential visit to Massachusetts
Marquis de Lafayette: 1784, after Revolutionary War was over, Marquis de Lafayette visited to honor General John Glover and to see his friend Elbridge Gerry. Returned in 1824.
President Andrew Jackson: 1830s (rumored)
President Chester Arthur: 1882, U.S. steamer anchored off Marblehead, was "kidnapped" after returning from Salem and brought to Abbott Hall where he was welcomed by Marbleheaders and gave short speech.
President Coolidge: 1925, visits Marblehead Harbor aboard the presidential yacht "USS Mayflower"
President Franklin Roosevelt: 1933, for sailing trip in Marblehead
Prince Olav of Norway: 1939 went sailing in Marblehead while touring United States
Senator John F. Kennedy: visited "Spirit of 76" painting with wife Jacqueline.
Mikhail Gorbachev

Celebrities
 Lucille Ball: 1947, arrived at Seaside park via helicopter to perform in summer theater series.
 Vivian Vance: performed in Marblehead Summer theater series.
Marjorie Merriweather Post: visited throughout 1930s and after the war, anchoring yacht Sea Cloud off Marblehead Light.
Walter Cronkite: 1997, for USS Constitution's 200th anniversary
Tallulah Bankhead
Billie Burke: Actress, best known as Glinda in The Wizard of Oz, performed in the 1955 Marblehead Summer Theatre Series
Gloria Vanderbilt: Actress, performed at Marblehead High School Auditorium, summer theatre series
Eva Gabor: Actress, performed in summer theatre series
Charles Coburn: Actor, performed in summer theatre series
Ethel Waters: American blues singer, "Stormy Weather", performed in Marblehead in 1955
Sarah Churchill: Actress, Winston Churchill's daughter, performed in summer series

Writers
 H. P. Lovecraft visited Marblehead in 1922, an event which had profound personal effect on him. He used Marblehead as his inspiration for the fictional town of Kingsport.

See: Arts, Films section for actors who came for location shooting.

Arts

Paintings 

Notable paintings & artists depicting Marblehead scenes and figures:

William Thompson Bartoll 
The Great Gale of 1846, oil on wood fireboard, 1850, Peabody Essex Museum
Alfred Thompson Bricher:
Castle Rock, Marblehead, 1878, Smithsonian American Art Museum
John Singleton Copley
Jeremiah Lee, oil portrait, 1769, The Wadsworth Atheneum
Mrs Jeremiah Lee, Martha Swett, oil portrait, 1769, The Wadsworth Atheneum
Clement Drew
Yachts Off Halfway Rock Marblehead, oil on board, 1884.
J.O.J. Frost
Waterfront of Old Town, paint on masonite, 1924, Marblehead Historical Society
The March into Boston from Marblehead...April 16, 1861, oil on fiberboard, 1925, Peabody Essex Museum
The Marblehead Fishermen, oil on board, Smithsonian American Art Museum
James Jeffrey Grant
From the Hilltop, Marblehead, Mass
Marblehead, 
Frederick Childe Hassam
Panorama of Marblehead, Marblehead Messenger, illustration, 1880
M.H. Howes 
First International Yacht Race off Children's Island, oil on canvas, 1905
John Ross Key
On the Coast near Marblehead
Marblehead, Mass, Peabody Essex Museum
Fitz Henry Lane
Becalmed Off Halfway Rock, oil on canvas, 1860, Cape Ann Museum
Halfway Rock off Marblehead, oil on canvas, Cape Ann Museum
Orlando Rouland
Looking Over Old Marblehead, 1928, oil on Canvas
Moonlight on Washington Square, oil on canvas
Marblehead Common at night, oil on canvas
Old Town Rooftops, oil on canvas
Maurice Brazil Prendergast:
Marblehead, watercolor 1914. Museum of Fine Arts, Boston
Bathing, Marblehead, 1897, Museum of Fine Arts, Boston
Moonlight at Marblehead, 
Marblehead Harbor, –1920, Barnes Foundation, Philadelphia
Peaches Point, oil on canvas, Bowdoin College Museum of Art
Arthur Quartley
Morning off Marblehead, oil on canvas, 1879
John Singer Sargent
On deck of the Yacht Constellation, water color, 1924, Peabody Essex Museum
Rainy day on the deck of the yacht Constellation, water color, 1924
James David Smillie
At Marblehead Neck, etching, 1883, National Gallery of Art, Washington DC
Causeway - Marblehead Neck, etching, 1883
William R. Stone
Low Tide, Marblehead, Massachusetts,(Doliber's Cove) Oil on canvas, 1889
Mary Bradish Titcomb
Marblehead Harbor, oil on canvas
Sunday Morning, oil on canvas, 1920
House in Poplars, Marblehead Mass, gouche on board
Rockaway Street, watercolor, 1906
View of Marblehead, oil on canvas
Sedona Hill, Marblehead, oil on canvas
Stanley Wingate Woodward
The Old Spite House, Etching, Museum of Fine Arts, Boston

Films

Movies filmed in Marblehead include:

The Pride of the Clan starring Mary Pickford (1917) – Castle Rock (park transformed into Scottish village)
Home Before Dark (1958) – "Lafayette House" (used as primary home for filming)
Coma (1978)
The Witches of Eastwick (1986) – Abbott Hall (used for concert scene and reveal of Jack Nicholson's character)
The Good Son (1993)
Hocus Pocus (1993) – Old town streets (bike ride scene), Old Burial Hill (daytime cemetery), Crocker Park (Abbott Hall bells ringing), Witches night time flyover
Autumn Heart (2000)
Treading Water (2001)
What's the Worst That Could Happen? (2001)was filmed in Manchester-by-the-Sea, but scenes are set in Marblehead.
Moonlight Mile (2002)
Grown Ups (2010)
The Company Men (2010)
Grown Ups 2 (2012)
Hubie Halloween (2019)
Godmothered (2020)

Television

 Marblehead Manor (1987) was a sitcom about a wealthy Marblehead resident that ran for one season on CBS.
 Cheers, set in Boston, made three references to the town. Sam mentions sailing to Marblehead in Season 1, Episode 6. Diane mentions Sam having taken her to a bed and breakfast in Marblehead in Season 4, episode 15. Sam says that he will sail to Marblehead for relaxation in Season 5, Episode 1.
 In Sabrina, the Teenage Witch, Aunt Hilda makes reference to Marblehead in the sixth episode of the second season, entitled "Sabrina, the Teenage Boy."
 The TV movie The Crossing (2000) has General Washington (Jeff Daniels) speaking to Col. Glover (Sebastian Roché) about the men of Marblehead rowing across the Delaware.
 The West Wing Season 4 episode 18, "Privateers", has Mrs. Marion Cotesworth-Haye of Marblehead denouncing the first lady's (Stockard Channing) membership of the Daughters of the Revolution, when they learn that her distant relative was more pirate than patriot.
 The Handmaid's Tale mentions Marblehead in season one episode 7, entitled "The Other Side".

Literature

Set in Marblehead, or based on local figures 

Marblehead, by Joan Thompson: The town appears in the eponymous book debuting in 1978.
The Hearth & Eagle, by Anya Seton, traces the history of Marblehead from early settlement in 1630 to modern times through the story of one family, originally from Cornwall, who eventually ran Marblehead's Hearth & Eagle Inn.
Agnes Surriage, by Edwin Lassetter Bynner
The Fountain Inn, by Nathan P. Sanborn
 The Death and Life of Charlie St. Cloud, by Ben Sherwood, is set in Marblehead and features the Waterside Cemetery. A film adaptation was made in 2010.
General John Glover and His Marblehead Mariners, by George Athan Billias (1960)
The Wizard of Orne Hill and Other Tales of Old Marblehead, by Dorothy Miles
At the Point of Cutlass, by Gregory Flemming, tells the story of Marblehead's "Robinson Curusoe" Philip Ashton and is based on his memoirs
Hidden Silver, by Georgene Faulkner, Relates the story of a Marblehead family during the American Revolution
'Azor of Marblehead Series (1948–1960), by Maude Cowley 
Azor
Azor and the Haddock
Azor and the Blue-eyed Cow
Tor and Azor
Pringle and the Lavender Goat
Swansday at Redd's, A Marblehead Story, by Ray Cole
Remembering James J. H. Gregory: The Seed King, Philanthropist, Man, by Shari Kelley Worrell
Marblehead from HollyHocks to Hot Top, articles by John D Hill, Morrill S. Reynolds, Phyllis Masters, Percy L. Martin
Ashton's Memorial: An History of the Strange Adventures of Philip Ashton, Jr. (1725)
Marblehead's First Harbor: The Rich History of a Small Fishing Port, by Hugh Peabody Bishop and Brenda Bishop Booma
The Lace Reader, by Brunonia Barry
A Guide to Marblehead, by Samuel Roads Jr. (1881)
Old Marblehead, by Samuel Chamberlain (1940)
Peaches Point: The Summer World Of T.H. Shepard, By Timothy Shepard (1976)
History and Traditions of Marblehead, by Samuel Roads Jr. (1880)
In the Time of Worms: An Ancient Tale of Marblehead, by Kenelm Winslow Harris
Under the Golden Cod, by 350th Anniversary book Committee detailing the history of the congregation of Marblehead Old North Church from 1635 to 1985.
 Captains Courageous by Rudyard Kipling mentions the town 
The Autobiography of Ashley Bowen (1728–1813), by Ashley Bowen
Red On Black, A Marblehead Story, by Eben Weed
Where Away: The Story of USS Marblehead,  by George Sessions Perry and Mabel LeightonTen Hours Until Dawn, by Michael J. Tougias
Marblehead: The Spirit of '76 Lives Here, by Priscilla Sawyer Lord (1972)

Literature influenced by Marblehead 

Rabbi Small, by Harry Kemelman, takes place in the fictional town of Barnard's Crossing, a place based on Marblehead. Kemelman lived in Marblehead for 50 years.
 The Jesse Stone novels: Robert B. Parker supposedly based the fictional town of Paradise, in which the novels take place, on Marblehead. Both Paradise and Marblehead are on the coast in Essex County, Cape Ann is visible from them, and each has an annual Race Week yachting event.
 Kingsport – Horror and fantasy writer H. P. Lovecraft derived great inspiration from Marblehead. Following his first visit in December 1922, he retroactively reconfigured his fictional Kingsport in its own image. As of 1920, Kingsport was an unspecified location on Rhode Island, only mentioned in passing. Lovecraft likely based the name on that of Kingstown, R.I. Lovecraft regarded his experience of visiting Marblehead in 1922, however, as life-changing. Thereafter, he based his Kingsport on Marblehead.

Contemporary photographs of Marblehead

Voting History

External links 

Town of Marblehead 
Historic Marblehead – Audio walking tour
History and Traditions of Marblehead by Samuel Roads, Published 1880, 390 pages.

References

 
1629 establishments in Massachusetts
Populated coastal places in Massachusetts
Populated places established in 1629
Port cities and towns in Massachusetts
Towns in Essex County, Massachusetts
Towns in Massachusetts